Hristo Botev Stadium may refer to:

 Hristo Botev Stadium (Blagoevgrad)
 Hristo Botev Stadium (Gabrovo)
 Hristo Botev Stadium (Plovdiv)
 Hristo Botev Stadium (Vratsa)
 Hristo Botev Stadium (Botevgrad)